Spaniards in Sweden are citizens and residents of Sweden who are of Spanish descent. There are approximately 7,124 people born in Spain living in Sweden today, as well as 8,266 people born in Sweden with at least one parent born in Spain.

Notable Swedish Spaniards

See also  
 Spain–Sweden relations

References

Spaniards
Spaniards
 
Sweden
Spanish diaspora in Europe